The Little Rapid River is a river in Algoma District, Ontario, Canada.

See also
Rapid River (disambiguation)
List of rivers of Ontario

References

Rivers of Algoma District